Emre Can (born January 21, 1990) is a Turkish Grandmaster of chess. He earned FIDE titles as FIDE Master (FM) in 2006, International Master (IM) in 2007 and Grandmaster (GM) on July 25, 2010.

He was born in İzmir, Turkey on January 21, 1990. Emre Can is student of Information technology at Kadir Has University in Istanbul.

He began with chess playing at the age of seven. In 1999, Emre Can participated at the chess championship held in Antalya, Turkey becoming second in his age group. In 2000, he took part at the World Youth Chess Championship held in Oropesa del Mar, Spain. At the age of 16, he won the first title in his age category among 102 players from 19 countries at the 13th Youth Chess Olympiad held in Novi Sad, Serbia on July 1–9. He has a fourth place at the European U-18 Chess Championship. In 2011, he became the Turkish chess champion.

Achievements
Turkish Chess Championship 
 2006 - 5th
 2011 - champion

References

External links

Emre Can at chessgames.com

Living people
1990 births
People from İzmir
Turkish chess players
Chess grandmasters
Chess Olympiad competitors
Kadir Has University alumni